"Dream×Dream" is a song by Japanese singer-songwriter Rina Aiuchi. It was released on 28 April 2004 through Giza Studio, as the lead single from her fourth studio album Playgirl. The song reached number six in Japan and has sold over 60,398 copies nationwide. The song served as the theme song to the Japanese animated film, Detective Conan: Magician of the Silver Sky.

Track listing

Charts

Certification and sales

|-
! scope="row"| Japan (RIAJ)
| 
| 60,398 
|-
|}

Release history

References

2004 singles
2004 songs
J-pop songs
Song recordings produced by Daiko Nagato
Songs with music by Akihito Tokunaga
Songs written by Rina Aiuchi